Tschirn is a village in the district of Kronach in Oberfranken (Bavaria, Germany). Located in the Frankenwald mountain range, it incorporates the sections Tschirn, Dobermühle and Gemeindeschneidmühle. The oldest historical record dates 1276.

References

Kronach (district)